Michael Grobauer was a male Czech international table tennis player.

Table tennis career
He won a gold medal at the 1932 World Table Tennis Championships in the team event for Czechoslovakia.

See also
 List of table tennis players
 List of World Table Tennis Championships medalists

References

Czech male table tennis players
World Table Tennis Championships medalists